One Day in the Life of Noah Piugattuk is a Canadian drama film, directed by Zacharias Kunuk and released in 2019. The film dramatizes the true story of Noah Piugattuk (Apayata Kotierk), an Inuk hunter, over the day in 1961 when he was fatefully approached by a Canadian government agent (Kim Bodnia) who encouraged him to give up the traditional Inuit lifestyle and assimilate into a conventionally modern settlement.

The film premiered on May 11, 2019 at the Canadian pavilion in the 58th Venice Biennale. It received its Canadian premiere at the 2019 Toronto International Film Festival.

At the 2019 Vancouver International Film Festival, the film received the cash award for Best Canadian Film. In December 2019, the film was named to the Toronto International Film Festival's annual year-end Canada's Top Ten list.

References

2019 films
Canadian drama films
English-language Canadian films
Films directed by Zacharias Kunuk
Films about Inuit in Canada
2010s English-language films
2010s Canadian films